Buro may refer to:

Places
Burao, a city in Somaliland

People
Burro Banton or Buro Banton, born Donovan Spalding (born 1956), Jamaican dancehall reggae deejay popular in the mid-1980s and 1990s
Edi Buro (born 1987), Bosnian footballer
John J. Buro, American sportswriter, author, screenwriter and lyricist

Food
Burong isda, fermented fish and rice in Filipino cuisine
Burong mangga, pickled mangoes in Filipino cuisine
Tapai, fermented rice known in some Filipino languages as buro ("pickled")

See also
Buro 24/7, Russian digital company founded by Miroslava Duma
Buros, a commune in the Pyrénées-Atlantiques department in southwestern France
Büro, Büro ("Office, Office"), a German comedy television series
Politburo, or political bureau, the executive committee for communist parties